This is a list of Polish television related events from 2012.

Events
2 June - Dawid Podsiadło wins the second series of X Factor.
24 November - Acrobatic duo Delfina Przeszłowska & Bartek Byjoś win the fifth series of Mam talent!.

Debuts

Television shows

1990s
Klan (1997–present)

2000s
M jak miłość (2000–present)
Na Wspólnej (2003–present)
Pierwsza miłość (2004–present)
Dzień Dobry TVN (2005–present)
Mam talent! (2008–present)

2010s
The Voice of Poland (2011–present)
X Factor (2011–present)

Ending this year

Births

Deaths

See also
2012 in Poland